A slate is a thin piece of hard flat material, historically slate stone, which is used as a medium for writing.

Composition 

The writing slate consisted of a piece of slate, typically either 4x6 inches or 7x10 inches, encased in a wooden frame. 

A slate pencil was used to write on the slate board. It was made from a softer and lighter coloured stone such as shale or chalk.

Usually, a piece of cloth or slate sponge was used to clean it and this was sometimes attached with a string to the bottom of the writing slate.

History 
The exact origins of the writing slate remain unclear. References to its use can be found in the fourteenth century and evidence suggests that it was used in the sixteenth and seventeenth centuries. The central time period for the writing slate, however, "appears to begin in the later eighteenth century, when developments in sea and land transport permitted the gradual expansion of slate quarrying in Wales and the growth of a substantial slate workshop industry."

By the nineteenth century, writing slates were used around the world in nearly every school and were a central part of the slate industry. At the dawn of the twentieth century, writing slates were the primary tool in the classroom for students. In the 1930s (or later) writing slates began to be replaced by more modern methods. However, writing slates did not become obsolete. They are still made in the twenty-first century, though in small quantities.

The writing slate was sometimes used by industry workers to track goods and by sailors to calculate their geographical location at sea. Sometimes multiple pieces of slate were bound together into a "book" and horizontal lines were etched onto the slate surface as a guide for neat handwriting.

See also 

 Blackboard

References

External links 

Writing media
Slate
Educational devices